Dream Horse is a 2020 sports comedy-drama film directed by Euros Lyn from a screenplay by Neil McKay. The film stars Toni Collette, Damian Lewis, Owen Teale, Joanna Page, Karl Johnson, Steffan Rhodri, Anthony O'Donnell, Nicholas Farrell, and Siân Phillips, and follows the true story of Dream Alliance, a horse that raced in the Welsh Grand National. It had previously been the subject of the documentary, Dark Horse: The Incredible True Story of Dream Alliance.

Dream Horse had its world premiere at the Sundance Film Festival on 24 January 2020 and was released in the United States on 21 May 2021, by Bleecker Street and in the United Kingdom on 4 June 2021, by Warner Bros. Pictures.

Synopsis
The film tells the true story of Dream Alliance, an unlikely race horse bred by Welsh bartender Jan Vokes. With very little money and no experience, Jan convinces her neighbours to chip in their earnings to help raise Dream in the hopes he can compete with the racing elites. The group's investment pays off as Dream rises through the ranks with grit and determination and goes on to race in the Welsh Grand National.

Cast
 Toni Collette as Jan Vokes
 Damian Lewis as Howard Davies
 Owen Teale as Brian Vokes
 Joanna Page as Angela Davies
 Nicholas Farrell as Philip Hobbs
 Siân Phillips as Maureen
 Karl Johnson as Kerby
 Peter Davison as Lord Avery
 Steffan Rhodri as Gerwyn
 Anthony O'Donnell as Maldwyn
 Di Botcher as Nerys
 Alex Jordan as Johnson White
 Max Hutchinson as James Lingsford
 Lynda Baron as Elsie
 Asheq Akhtar as Peter 
 Darren Evans as Goose
 Katherine Jenkins as herself
 Clare Balding as herself

Production
It was announced in March 2019 that Euros Lyn was directing the film, with Toni Collette and Damian Lewis cast in the lead roles. Owen Teale, Joanna Page, Nicholas Farrell, Siân Phillips and Karl Johnson were added in May.

Filming began by May 2019 in Wales.

Release
Dream Horse had its world premiere at the Sundance Film Festival on 24 January 2020. The film was originally scheduled to be released in the United Kingdom on 17 April 2020, and in the United States on 1 May 2020, but these were delayed due to the COVID-19 pandemic. The film was eventually released to theaters on May 21, 2021 and was released on DVD, July 20, 2021.

Reception

Box office 
Dream Horse grossed $796,000 from 1,254 theaters in its opening weekend. Females made up 62% of the audience, with 85% being over the age of 25.

Critical response 
On the review aggregator website Rotten Tomatoes, 88% of 132 reviews are positive, with an average rating of 6.7/10. The site's critics consensus reads, "Spurred on by an excellent Toni Collette, Dream Horse has a comfortably crowd-pleasing gait that makes the most of the story's familiar formula." On Metacritic, the film has a weighted average score of 68 out of 100, based on 30 critics, indicating "generally favorable reviews". According to PostTrak, 81% of audience members gave the film a positive score, with 57% saying they would definitely recommend it.

References

External links
 

2020 films
2020s sports comedy-drama films
American horse racing films
American sports comedy-drama films
Bleecker Street films
British films based on actual events
British horse racing films
British sports comedy-drama films
Film4 Productions films
Films postponed due to the COVID-19 pandemic
Films shot in Wales
Warner Bros. films
Stage 6 Films films
Topic Studios films
2020 independent films
2020 comedy-drama films
2020s English-language films
Films directed by Euros Lyn
2020s American films
2020s British films